The 2000 Ugandan Super League was the 33rd season of the official Ugandan football championship, the top-level football league of Uganda.

Overview
The 2000 Uganda Super League was contested by 16 teams and was won by SC Villa, while Nile Breweries FC, Health, UTODA (Uganda Taxi Operators and Drivers Association), Arua Municipal Council FC, Kakira Sugar Works FC and UPDF FC were relegated.

League standings

Leading goalscorer
The top goalscorer in the 2000 season was Andrew Mukasa of SC Villa with 27 goals.

Footnotes

External links
Uganda - List of Champions - RSSSF (Hans Schöggl)
Ugandan Football League Tables - League321.com

Ugandan Super League seasons
1
Uganda
Uganda